Leinster Nomads was an association football club based in Dublin, Ireland, which was formed in 1890 by former members of Dublin Association F.C. Dublin Association had folded that same year after a dispute with the Irish Football Association surrounding an Irish Cup semi-final tie with Cliftonville in which it was alleged that match officials were connected to Cliftonville. After the IFA to replay or terminate the tie, Association pulled out of the competition and folded as a club.

On 27 October 1892, Nomads were one of five football clubs present at the foundation of the Leinster Football Association (LFA), at a meeting in the Wicklow Hotel on Exchequer Street, Dublin. Shortly after, the LFA became affiliated to the Irish Football Association and the LFA soon organized their own cup competition, the Leinster Senior Cup, which was first played for in 1892–93. The inaugural final saw Nomads defeat Dublin University 2–1. After the inaugural win by Nomads, Bohemians and Shelbourne monopolised the cup for the next twenty-four years.

Within a few seasons the Leinster Senior League was also established. Ciarán Priestley highlights a printed notice in the 4 September 1894 edition of The Irish Times. Under the headline "Leinster Football League" there is a report of "a general meeting of the league... held the other evening at 27 D'Olier Street". Priestley also lists Nomads, alongside Bohemians, Britannia, Dublin University, Phoenix and Montpelier as participants in the first season. However other sources suggest the league started a little later and was first played for in 1896–97 and that an unidentified British Army regimental team were the inaugural winners while Shelbourne were runners up.

International and Inter-provincial representation
Unlike its predecessor club, Dublin Association, the Nomads never had players represented on the Ireland team. The club itself saw this as a political move by the Belfast-based Irish Football Association, claiming that the IFA's selection committee of five men in Belfast were preventing anyone outside of that city to represent Ireland. The team did have representation in select teams representing the Leinster FA and Dublin. On 9 December 1893, in Belfast, two Nomads members were part of a Leinster team that faced Ulster, including R.H. Harrison, who captained the side.

Leinster Football Association (LFA) interprovincials 1893-1895
  R.H. Harrison 
  D.J. Morrogh
  Bennett
  Gillespie
  Keogh

Dublin inter-county representatives 1893-1895
  D. Morrogh
  Gillespie
  Keogh

Honours
Leinster Senior Cup
 Winners: 1892–93:  1

References

Association football clubs in Dublin (city)
Association football clubs established in 1890
1890 establishments in Ireland
Association football clubs in Ireland
Former Leinster Senior League clubs